Gerasimos Arsenis (30 May 1931 – 19 April 2016) was a Greek politician who served as a Member of the Hellenic Parliament and as a Minister in several Governments with the Panhellenic Socialist Movement.

Life
Gerasimos Arsenis was born in Lourdháta, on the Greek island of Kephalonia. He went on to study Law at the National and Kapodistrian University of Athens and after obtaining his degree, he continued his post-graduate studies at the Massachusetts Institute of Technology (MIT). It is claimed that he is trilingual, fluent in Greek, English and French. From 1960 until 1964, Arsenis served as an economist with the United Nations Secretariat (working for the Prebisch Group), preparing for the establishment of the United Nations Conference on Trade and Development (UNCTAD). In 1964, he quit his post with the UN and was appointed to the position of Director of the Research Division of the OECD Development Centre in Paris, where he remained until 1967.

In 1967, Arsenis was appointed to the position of Senior Economist of the UNCTAD and, in 1974, he was promoted to the seat of Director. During this period as director, Arsenis engaged in research and participated in negotiations concerning reform of the International Monetary System. From 1974 until 1980, Arsenis also served as an independent expert with UNCTAD, providing consultancy to the Ministerial Committee of Twenty on the Reform of the International Monetary System (later known as the IMF "Interim Committee"). While serving as Director of UNCTAD, Arsenis contributed to the development of numerous proposals – including the creation of special drawing rights (SDR), developmental assistance and coordination of program assistance for the World Bank and the generation of balance-of-payments financing that the IMF subsequently used for effective stabilization and development support schemes.

In November 1981, he was appointed as Governor of the Bank of Greece, where he remained until February, 1984. During this period, Arsenis oversaw the liberalization of the Greek financial system and modernization of its financial regulatory system. Arsenis acted as a policy advisor to numerous governments regarding foreign exchange, external financing and debt rescheduling.

Gerasimos Arsenis was married to Louka Katseli, with whom he has raised four children, and resided in the Greek capital of Athens. Arsenis died on 19 April 2016.

Political career
Arsenis began his career in politics in 1982, when he was appointed to the position of Minister of National Economy with the Panhellenic Socialist Movement, a position that he held until 1985. In 1984, he served as a Minister of Economics and was appointed to the Ministry of Mercantile Marine a year later, a position that he held for only a month due to a disagreement on a few matters of economic policy with the Prime Minister, Andreas Papandreou. He was replaced by Costas Simitis.

In 1986, Arsenis was expelled from the party, due to severe disagreements with the policies of the government. Afterwards, he founded the Greek Socialist Party, which did not appeal to enough Greek voters and was therefore dissolved.

He returned to the Panhellenic Socialist Movement in 1989, which won the national elections of 1993, and Gerasimos Arsenis was appointed the Minister of Defence until 1996. He was the Minister of Defense during the Imia crisis. During his post as the Minister, he promoted the new Defense Dogma for Greece and Cyprus, restructured the Defense procurement, and pursued policies of co-operation in the Defense arena with a number of countries in the region.

After the resignation of Andreas Papandreou from the Presidency of the Party, owing to health problems, after a three-month-long hospitalization, which had incapacitated him and created a serious power-vacuum in Greece, the members of the Party asked for elections for a successor. Arsenis announced his candidacy to replace Papandreou, but he lost to Costas Simitis and trailed the second candidate, Akis Tsohatzopoulos.

In 1996, during the government of Costas Simitis, he was appointed as Minister of Education, a position that he held until 2000. Gerasimos Arsenis faced significant opposition for the educational system changes he proposed, some of which, however, stand to this day.

Arsenis was a member of the Hellenic Parliament from 1985 to 1989 (one term), from 1990 to 2004 (four consecutive terms) and from 2006 to 2007 (one term).

References

External links
 Official Website of Gerasimos Arsenis  - 
    Terms of Office of Gerasimos Arsenis in the Hellenic Parliament

1931 births
2016 deaths
PASOK politicians
Massachusetts Institute of Technology alumni
National and Kapodistrian University of Athens alumni
People from Cephalonia
Ministers of National Education and Religious Affairs of Greece
Ministers of National Defence of Greece
Governors of the Bank of Greece
Economy ministers of Greece
Finance ministers of Greece
20th-century Greek economists
Ministers for Mercantile Marine of Greece
Greek MPs 1985–1989
Greek MPs 1990–1993
Greek MPs 1993–1996
Greek MPs 1996–2000
Greek MPs 2000–2004
Greek MPs 2004–2007